Ursula Grace is a former camogie player, scorer of the winning goal in the 1974 All Ireland final that resulted in a breakthrough victory for Kilkenny.

Career
A schools star with Presentation Secondary School, Kilkenny in 1970, she won three All Ireland Club medals with St Paul’s in 1970, 1974 and 1976, and played in the 1977 final. She won a Leinster championship medal in 1975.

References

External links
 Camogie.ie Official Camogie Association Website
 Wikipedia List of Camogie players

Kilkenny camogie players
Living people
Year of birth missing (living people)